Stroppiana is a comune (municipality) in the Province of Vercelli in the Italian region Piedmont, located about  northeast of Turin and about  southeast of Vercelli.

Stroppiana borders the following municipalities: Asigliano Vercellese, Caresana, Pertengo, Pezzana, Rive, and Villanova Monferrato.

Notable people
Giovanni Barberis

References

Cities and towns in Piedmont